Centaurea nervosa is a species of Centaurea found in Italy in the North ( in the Alps ) where it is common, the Tuscan- Emilian where it is rare, Outside Italy in the Alps and in the French Alpine departments, in the cantons of Valais, Ticino and Graubünden of Switzerland, the provinces of Carinthia in Austria, in the Carpathian Mountains of Slovenia.

References

External links

nervosa
Plants described in 1809